Quantum algebra is one of the top-level mathematics categories used by the arXiv. It is the study of noncommutative analogues and generalizations of  commutative algebras, especially those arising in Lie theory.

Subjects include:
Quantum groups
Skein theories
Operadic algebra
Diagrammatic algebra
Quantum field theory
Racks and quandles

See also 
Coherent states in mathematical physics
Glossary of areas of mathematics
Mathematics Subject Classification
Ordered type system, a substructural type system
Outline of mathematics
Quantum logic

References

External links
Quantum algebra at arxiv.org

Quantum groups